Azerbaijan participated at the 2022 Winter Paralympics in Beijing, China which took place between 4–13 March 2022. It was the first time Azerbaijan participated at the Winter Paralympics.

Rauf Mursalov served as Chef de Mission. Mehman Ramazanzade would have been the flagbearer for Azerbaijan during the opening ceremony, but due to the injury he missed the ceremony. At the opening ceremony, the Azerbaijani delegation included Rauf Mursalov, Azer Tapdygov and Magomed Ismailov.

In 2008, Ramazanzade competed in powerlifting in the men's 100 kg event at the 2008 Summer Paralympics held in Beijing, China.

Competitors
The following is the list of number of competitors participating at the Games per sport/discipline.

Cross-country skiing

Azerbaijan qualified one athlete to compete in cross-country skiing. At the last training session on the eve of the start, the only athlete of Azerbaijan Mehman Ramazanzade was seriously injured. He was supposed to compete on the 9th of March in the cross-country competition (sitting) but was not be able to compete.

See also
Azerbaijan at the Paralympics
Azerbaijan at the 2022 Winter Olympics

References

Nations at the 2022 Winter Paralympics
2022
Winter Paralympics